The following elections occurred in 1969.

 1969 Botswana general election
 1969 Chadian parliamentary election
 1969 Chadian presidential election
 1969 Chilean parliamentary election
 1969 Ethiopian general election
 1969 Gabonese legislative election
 1969 Kenyan general election
 1969 Norwegian parliamentary election
 1969 Ghanaian parliamentary election
 1969 Philippine House of Representatives elections
 1969 Philippine Senate election
 1969 Philippine general election
 1969 Philippine presidential election
 1969 Rwandan general election
 1969 Somali parliamentary election

Africa
 1969 Rhodesian constitutional referendum
 1969 Zambian constitutional referendum

Asia
 1969 Afghan parliamentary election
 1969 Israeli legislative election
 1969 Malaysian general election
 1969 Philippine House of Representatives elections
 1969 Republic of China legislative election
 1969 Sarawak state election

India
 1969 Indian presidential election

Australia
 1969 Australian federal election
 1969 Tasmanian state election

Europe
 1969 Gibraltar general election
 1969 Irish general election
 1969 Polish legislative election
 1969 Portuguese National Assembly election
 1969 Turkish general election

France
 1969 French presidential election
 1969 French constitutional referendum

Germany
 1969 West German federal election

United Kingdom
 1969 Birmingham Ladywood by-election
 1969 Glasgow Gorbals by-election
 1969 Islington North by-election
 1969 Louth by-election
 1969 Mid Ulster by-election
 1969 Newcastle-under-Lyme by-election
 1969 Northern Ireland general election
 1969 Paddington North by-election
 1969 Swindon by-election
 1969 Ulster Unionist Party leadership election

North America
 1969 British Honduras legislative election

Canada
 1969 British Columbia general election
 1969 Manitoba general election
 1969 New Democratic Party of Manitoba leadership election
 1969 Ottawa municipal election
 1969 Toronto municipal election

United States
 The Battle of Aspen
 1969–70 New Orleans mayoral election
 1969 Pittsburgh mayoral election
 1969 New York City mayoral election

United States mayoral
 The Battle of Aspen
 1969–70 New Orleans mayoral election
 1969 Pittsburgh mayoral election
 1969 New York City mayoral election

United States gubernatorial
 1969 Maryland special gubernatorial election

Colorado
 The Battle of Aspen

Louisiana
 1969–70 New Orleans mayoral election

Maryland
 1969 Maryland special gubernatorial election

New York
 1969 New York City mayoral election

Pennsylvania
 1969 Pittsburgh mayoral election

Oceania
 1969 New Zealand general election

Australia
 1969 Australian federal election
 1969 Tasmanian state election

See also

 
1969
Elections